Phoenix Tower stands at the northeast corner of the city walls in Chester, England.  The tower is recorded in the National Heritage List for England as a designated Grade I listed building.  It has also been known as Newton Tower and King Charles' Tower.

History

The structure probably originated in the 13th century.  During the later part of the 16th century the tower was leased to two city guilds, the Painters and Stationers, and the Barbers and Chandlers, who sublet it to other guilds.  By 1612 the fabric of the tower was in a poor condition, and the lead had been lost from its roof.  It was restored by the two guilds, and above the door they placed a plaque containing the date 1613 and a carving of a phoenix, the emblem of the Painters.  In the Civil War, during the Siege of Chester in 1645, the tower had a gun in each storey, and it was damaged in the conflict.  A plaque on the tower states that King Charles I stood on the tower on 24 September 1645 as he watched his soldiers being defeated at the Battle of Rowton Heath. The historian Simon Ward has expressed doubts about this and has suggested that the king may have stood instead on a tower of Chester Cathedral, which he considers is confirmed by evidence that a captain standing beside him was killed by a stray shot.

The guilds resumed possession of the tower in 1658, and repaired it.  They ceased possession by about 1773, after which the city carried out repairs.  However, by 1838, the tower was described as being in a dilapidated condition.  By this time, the city was promoting it as a tourist attraction because of its reputed connection with King Charles. In the late 1850s, the lower chamber was being used by a print-seller, and later in the century the tower was made a private museum.

Architecture

The tower is constructed in red coursed sandstone, with a pyramidal slate roof. The tower is in four stages, the lower two of which are below the walkway on the wall. Each of the upper stages contains a chamber. At the level of the walkway, in the third stage, is a round-headed doorway. Above the doorway is a plaque dated 1613 containing the carved image of a phoenix. An external stairway leads to the upper storey. Externally, between the upper two stages, is a string course. In the upper stage is a doorway and four three-light leaded casement windows. The top of the tower has a battlemented parapet, lead hip roofs and an ornate weathervane.

See also

List of sections of Chester city walls and associated structures
Grade I listed buildings in Cheshire West and Chester

References

External links 

The Phoenix Tower (Chester, England)
The Phoenix Tower on 'Chester: a Virtual Stroll Around the Walls'

Phoenix Tower
Grade I listed buildings in Chester
Grade I listed towers
Towers in Cheshire